The 31st District of the Iowa House of Representatives is a district in the state of Iowa.

Current elected officials
Rick Olson is the representative currently representing the district.

Past representatives
The district has previously been represented by:
 Clyde Rex, 1971–1973
 Russell L. Wyckoff, 1973–1979
 Perry K. Hummel, 1979–1983
 Semor C. Tofte, 1983–1985
 Paul W. Johnson, 1985–1991
 Chuck Gipp, 1991–2003
 Gene Manternach, 2003–2005
 Ray Zirkelbach, 2005–2011
 Lee Hein, 2011–2013
 Rick Olson, 2013–present

References

031